Gabriella Grace Pizzolo (born March 10, 2003) is an American actress and singer. She first made her breakthrough on Broadway for her portrayal as Matilda in Matilda the Musical (2013) and Fun Home (2015). In 2019, she received widespread recognition for her role as Suzie Bingham in Stranger Things.

Career
Pizzolo appeared in several regional productions before making her Broadway debut as the title character in Matilda the Musical. She had auditioned for the original cast of Matilda and received several callbacks but was not cast. She auditioned again and was successful, giving her first performance of the role on December 22, 2013. She made several public appearances as Matilda, such as Broadway at Bryant Park and a Ralph Lauren Fashion Show. Her final performance in the role was on September 13, 2014. In March 2015, Pizzolo was cast as the understudy for the roles of Small Alison, Christian and John in the musical Fun Home. After the departure of Sydney Lucas in October 2015, Pizzolo assumed the role of Small Alison. During her tenure in the role, she performed "Ring of Keys" at several events, including the 20th SAGE Awards and the White House. Pizzolo played the role until the production closed on September 10, 2016.

In October 2016, Pizzolo performed in the concert version of Sunday in the Park with George at New York City Center. From January 2017, she played Opal in the musical Because of Winn Dixie at the Alabama Shakespeare Festival. Pizzolo voices Cricket in the 2018 series Butterbean's Café. She plays Suzie Bingham in season 3 of Stranger Things (2019), reprising her role again in the fourth season (2022).

Personal life
Pizzolo lives in upstate New York with her parents and younger sister. Her mother, Natalie, is a teacher who homeschooled her when she was in Matilda. Pizzolo is non-binary, using she/they pronouns, and pansexual.

Filmography

Television

Theatre

References

External links

Pizzolo interview, Broadway.com (2015)
Pizzolo sings "Ring of Keys" at 5:30 (2015)
Pizzolo sings the U.S. national anthem at an NFL game (2015)

Living people
Actresses from New York (state)
American child actresses
American musical theatre actresses
American television actresses
People from Niskayuna, New York
2003 births
American people of Italian descent
21st-century American women
American LGBT artists
Pansexual non-binary people